Carlo Delle Piane (2 February 1936 – 23 August 2019) was an Italian film actor. From 1948 until his death, he appeared in more than 100 films.

Born in Rome, Delle Piane made his debut at the age of twelve in Duilio Coletti's Heart; he starred in the stereotypal role of an arrogant but basically kind-hearted boy in many films until the mid-fifties. The turning point of his career was the encounter with Pupi Avati, with whom Delle Piane experienced more significant and varied roles, going from comic surreal performances to melancholic and even dramatic shades.

In 1984, he won the Nastro d'Argento for Best Actor for his performance in Una gita scolastica. For his role in Regalo di Natale he won the Volpi Cup at the 43rd Venice International Film Festival.

Selected filmography

 Cuore (1948)
 Ring Around the Clock (1950)
 Domani è troppo tardi (1950)
 Beauties in Capri, regia di Luigi Capuano e Adelchi Bianchi (1951)
 The Passaguai Family, regia di Aldo Fabrizi (1951)
 Guardie e ladri (1951)
 Mamma Mia, What an Impression! (1951)
 I'm the Capataz (1951)
 The Passaguai Family Gets Rich (1952)
 The Piano Tuner Has Arrived, regia di Duilio Coletti (1952)
 Papà diventa mamma (1952)
 Lieutenant Giorgio (1952)
 A Thief in Paradise (1952)
 L'uomo, la bestia e la virtù (1953)
 La grande speranza (1954)
 Un americano a Roma (1954)
 Serenata per sedici bionde (1957)
 Sait-on jamais...) (1957)
 Ladro lui, ladra lei (1958)
 Adorabili e bugiarde (1958)
 Fortunella (1958)
 The Friend of the Jaguar (1959)
 Un mandarino per Teo (1960)
 Totò e Cleopatra (1963)
 Il monaco di Monza (1963)
 Totò contro i quattro (1963)
 Caccia alla volpe (1966)
 Susanna... ed i suoi dolci vizi alla corte del re (Frau Wirtin hat auch einen Grafen) (1968)
 The Archangel (1969)
 Pensiero d'amore (1969)
 What? (1972)
 La signora gioca bene a scopa? (1974)
 L'insegnante (1975)
 Una bella governante di colore (1976)
 Una gita scolastica (1983)
 Festa di laurea (1985)
 Regalo di Natale (1986)
 I giorni del commissario Ambrosio (1988)
 Condominio (1991)
 Dichiarazioni d'amore (1994)
 An American Love (1994)
 Io e il re (1995)
 I cavalieri che fecero l'impresa (2001)
 La rivincita di Natale (2004)
 Tickets (2005)
 Nessun messaggio in segreteria (2005)

References

External links

1936 births
2019 deaths
Italian male film actors
Italian male child actors
Italian male television actors
Italian male stage actors
Nastro d'Argento winners
People from the Metropolitan City of Rome Capital
Volpi Cup for Best Actor winners
20th-century Italian male actors